Lynda Rosen Obst (born April 14, 1950) is an American feature film producer and author.

Career
Obst is a graduate of Pomona College in Claremont, California and then studied Philosophy in the graduate program at Columbia University. Later she worked as an editor at The New York Times before moving to Los Angeles with her then-husband David Obst. Starting at The Geffen Film Company as a d-girl, her first major project was developing the scripts that would eventually become Flashdance.

Obst partnered with Debra Hill in 1986. The partnership would go on to produce Adventures in Babysitting, Heartbreak Hotel and The Fisher King, among other projects. Following The Fisher King (1991), Obst and Hill parted ways; she became an in-studio producer going on to produce such notable films as Sleepless in Seattle, One Fine Day, Someone Like You, Contact and The Siege.

In 1989, Obst founded the production company Lynda Obst Productions. Initially based at Columbia Pictures, it moved to 20th Century Fox in 1993. By 2007, the company was named Obst/Rosen Productions.

In 2009, Obst completed principal photography as producer on the Ricky Gervais–Matthew Robinson co-writing and directing debut, The Invention of Lying (originally titled "This Side of the Truth"), starring Ricky Gervais and Jennifer Garner. The film was released in October 2009. She was also the producer of Gurinder Chadha's Angus, Thongs and Perfect Snogging, released by Nickelodeon in 2008. In 2014, Obst collaborated with director Christopher Nolan to co-produce Interstellar, a science-fiction drama starring Matthew McConaughey and Anne Hathaway. This marked the first time her production company, Lynda Obst Productions, was credited for a production.

Obst is the author of the memoir Hello, He Lied (1996), which details her experiences in the modern studio system. She was one of the central figures in the battle over the Richard Preston article Crisis in the Hot Zone. Rick Rosen, one of the founders of the Endeavor talent agency, is Obst's younger brother.

Lynda Obst Productions

Lynda Obst Productions is an American film and television production company founded by Lynda Obst. She formed the company in 1989 and moved it to Columbia Pictures. In 1993, her company moved to 20th Century Fox. While Obst has producer credits for films from the 1980s to present, Interstellar was the first to display her company banner.

Film and television
Interstellar (2014) – film
Good Girls Revolt (2015–2016) – television
The Hot Zone (2019) – television

Filmography 
She was a producer in all films unless otherwise noted.

Film

Thanks

Television

As writer

Publications 
 The Sixties (Random House: New York, NY, 1978. )
 Dirty Dreams: A Novel (New Amer Library Trade: New York, NY, 1990. )
 Hello, He Lied (Little, Brown & Company: New York, NY, 1996. )
 Sleepless in Hollywood: Tales from the New Abnormal in the Movie Business (Simon & Schuster: New York, NY, 2013. )

References

External links 
 
 Lynda Obst Productions
 Interview with Lynda Obst for The Women Take Over

1950 births
Film producers from California
American memoirists
Living people
Columbia Graduate School of Arts and Sciences alumni
Pomona College alumni
The New York Times editors
Writers from New York City
American women memoirists
American women film producers
Film producers from New York (state)
21st-century American women